Coleanthus is a genus of Eurasian and North American plants in the grass family. The only known species is Coleanthus subtilis. It has a scattered distribution, found on lakeshores, streambanks, and other wet places in central Europe (France, Germany, Czech Rep; extinct in Norway + Italy), Asia (Western Siberia, Khabarovsk, eastern China), and northwestern North America (Oregon, Washington, British Columbia).

References 

Pooideae
Grasses of Asia
Grasses of Europe
Grasses of North America
Monotypic Poaceae genera